Deutsche Schule Stockholm is a German international school in Stockholm, Sweden. It serves levels Vorschule through year 12 of gymnasium.

History 
In 1612 the German Church, Stockholm received the privilege by the then-reigning Swedish king Gustavus II Adolphus to form a German school. As Stockholm had been a destination for traders of the Hanseatic League for a long time, the children of these German-speaking mercenaries had to find a place to educate themselves, which was found in the German School.

References

External links

  Deutsche Schule Stockholm
  Deutsche Schule Stockholm

Stockholm
Schools in Stockholm
International schools in Sweden
Germany–Sweden relations